Scholes is a village in Kirklees, West Yorkshire, England. It is situated 1 mile (2 km) to the south-east and above Holmfirth, 7 miles (11 km) south-west of Huddersfield, in the Holme Valley. It has a population of 1,990. 
The name Scholes may have originated from the Scandinavian language meaning 'the temporary huts or sheds'.

The village contains one non denominational primary school, originally built in 1908, modernised in 1976 and extended in 1986. The school caters for approximately 213 pupils aged four to eleven.

Scholes was the birthplace of the entertainer Roy Castle, well known as the presenter of the long-running BBC show Record Breakers.

Peter Brook was born in Scholes to farmer parents.

Local sports
Scholes has a successful cricket team in the Drakes Huddersfield League and a football team, (Scholes FC) who sealed promotion to Division 1 of the Huddersfield & District FA competition as of the end of the 2018–19 season with a game to spare finishing 2nd in Division 2 on 59 points.

Scholes in West Yorkshire
There are two other villages and a hamlet with the same name in the county of West Yorkshire. One village is near Cleckheaton and the other one is east of Leeds. The hamlet is east of Oakworth near Keighley.

References

External links

 Scholes (Holmfirth) J&I School Ofsted Reports

Holme Valley
Villages in West Yorkshire
Towns and villages of the Peak District
Geography of Holmfirth